The 2001 Lehigh Mountain Hawks football team was an American football team that represented Lehigh University during the 2001 NCAA Division I-AA football season. Lehigh was undefeated in the regular season and won a fourth consecutive Patriot League championship, but lost in the second round of the Division I-AA national playoffs.

In their first year under head coach Pete Lembo, the Mountain Hawks compiled a 11–1 record (10–0 in the regular season). Brant Hall, Matt Salvaterra, Josh Snyder and Morris Taylor were the team captains.

The Mountain Hawks outscored opponents 410 to 182. With the addition of Georgetown to the conference, Lehigh's undefeated record made it the first team to win seven Patriot League games in one year.  

The Mountain Hawks were ranked No. 10 in the preseason Division I-AA national poll, and rose in the rankings as their 10-game win streak progressed, ending the season at No. 5. Lehigh qualified for the Division I-AA playoffs, hosting and winning a first-round game before losing, in the quarterfinals, to eventual national runner-up Furman.

Like most of the Patriot League, Lehigh played just 10 of its 11 scheduled regular season games, after its September 15 matchup, against Ivy League opponent Penn, was canceled following the September 11 attacks. 

Lehigh played its home games at Goodman Stadium on the university's Goodman Campus in Bethlehem, Pennsylvania.

Schedule

References

Lehigh
Lehigh Mountain Hawks football seasons
Patriot League football champion seasons
Lehigh Mountain Hawks football